The Mentawai long-tailed giant rat (Leopoldamys siporanus) is a species of rodent in the family Muridae.
It is endemic to the  Mentawai Islands archipelago off the west coast of Sumatra, in Indonesia.
Its natural habitat is subtropical or tropical dry forest.
It is threatened by habitat loss.

References

Rats of Asia
Leopoldamys
Endemic fauna of Indonesia
Rodents of Indonesia
Fauna of Sumatra
Mentawai Islands Regency
Vulnerable fauna of Asia
Mammals described in 1895
Taxa named by Oldfield Thomas
Taxonomy articles created by Polbot